Philippe Bobin (born 24 January 1955) is a French athlete. He competed in the men's decathlon at the 1976 Summer Olympics.

References

1955 births
Living people
Athletes (track and field) at the 1976 Summer Olympics
French decathletes
Olympic athletes of France
Athletes from Paris
Universiade silver medalists for France
Universiade medalists in athletics (track and field)
Medalists at the 1975 Summer Universiade